Baseodiscus mexicanus is a species of proboscis worm in the family  Valenciniidae.

Description
This species commonly grows 1 to 2 metres long and 5 to 7 mm wide. It does not contract significantly when physically contacted or killed. When it does actually contract strongly, it has a flattened appearance, being widest immediately behind the back of the head. The part of the body containing the intestines is flat and broad. The posterior is very thin.

Distribution
Baseodiscus mexicanus is found in abundance on the Pacific east coast in the waters of Panama and Mexico, as well as in the Galapagos Islands. It has been found nowhere else.

References

Heteronemertea
Marine animals
Animals described in 1893